Birhan Dagne (born 8 April 1978) is an Ethiopian-born British long-distance runner.

Dagne was born, and grew up, in Ethiopia. She was a promising international athlete and in 1994 represented her country of birth; at the
IAAF World Road Relay Championships, in both 3000m and 10000m at the World Junior Championships in Athletics, IAAF World Cross Country Championships and African Junior Athletics Championships.

At the age of 17 she was assaulted by a soldier because she was one of the minority Amhara ethnic group, while the ruling party in Ethiopia was Tigrayan. 
Later that year she flew to the UK as part of the Ethiopian junior cross country team for the 1995 IAAF World Cross Country Championships. Birhan finished fifth in the race and along with Alemitu Bekele(7th), Yemenashu Taye(8th) and Ayelech Worku(11th) took the silver medal in the team event. Early the following morning Dagne took a train to London, with fellow athletes Askale Bireda and Getenesh Tamirat, to seek political asylum.
The UK Government refused asylum to the athletes, but Dagne and Bireda successfully appealed against this decision.

During this time the asylum seeking Ethiopian athletes trained at the Woodford Green with Essex Ladies athletic club.
The IAAF approved her changes of allegiance on 1 December 1998 and soon after represented Great Britain at the 1999 IAAF World Cross Country Championships.

Dagne became a member of the London-based Belgrave Harriers athletics club and ran in many domestic Half-Marathon and Marathon races.
In 2004 Dagne finished less than a minute behind the first Briton, a relatively unknown, Tracey Morris in the London Marathon. This performance meant she just missed out on a trip to the 2004 Olympic Games.

International Competition

Other Races

References

External links

1978 births
Living people
Ethiopian female long-distance runners
British female long-distance runners
Ethiopian female marathon runners
British female marathon runners
Ethiopian emigrants to the United Kingdom